Aubrey Coleman (2 February 1888 – 17 November 1943) was a British wrestler. He competed in the men's freestyle middleweight at the 1908 Summer Olympics.

References

External links
 

1888 births
1943 deaths
British male sport wrestlers
Olympic wrestlers of Great Britain
Wrestlers at the 1908 Summer Olympics
People from Mildenhall, Suffolk